is a train station in Suma-ku, Kobe, Hyōgo Prefecture, Japan.

Lines
Sanyo Electric Railway
Sanyo Electric Railway Main Line

Adjacent stations

|-
!colspan=5|Sanyo Electric Railway

External links
Higashi-Suma Station (Sanyo Electric Railway)

Railway stations in Hyōgo Prefecture